Rocío Ruiz Molinero is a Spanish former footballer who played mostly as a defender.

Club career
Ruiz progressed through the academy at Atlético Madrid and played as a defender. In 2010, while still at Atlético, she appeared in El Mundo's "Uno de Seis Millones" special feature. In 2012, following issues with her foot while playing for Rayo Vallecano, she retired from football at the age of 21. She stated her intention to go into coaching and to continue working within football. Her former club Atlético Madrid sent a message of support following the announcement of her retirement, citing her being part of their team that won promotion to the Primera División in 2006 as a career highlight.

International career

As an under-19 international she played in the 2008 U-19 European Championship.

References

1990 births
Living people
Spanish women's footballers
Primera División (women) players
Atlético Madrid Femenino players
Rayo Vallecano Femenino players
Women's association football defenders
Footballers from Madrid
Spain women's youth international footballers